Antoine Arthur Fabien Brizard (born 22 May 1994) is a French professional volleyball player. He is a member of the France national team, and the 2020 Olympic Champion. At the professional club level, he plays for Gas Sales Piacenza.

Honours

Clubs
 CEV Cup
  2013/2014 – with Paris Volley
  2020/2021 – with Zenit Saint Petersburg

 National championships
 2012/2013  French Championship, with Paris Volley
 2013/2014  French SuperCup, with Paris Volley
 2013/2014  French Championship, with Paris Volley
 2014/2015  French Championship, with Paris Volley
 2016/2017  French Championship, with Spacer's de Toulouse
 2018/2019  Polish Championship, with Onico Warsaw
 2022/2023  Italian Cup, with Gas Sales Bluenergy Piacenza

Youth national team
 2011  CEV U19 European Championship

Individual awards
 2011: FIVB U19 World Championship – Best Setter

State awards
 2021:  Knight of the Legion of Honour

Reference

External links

 
 Player profile at LegaVolley.it 
 Player profile at PlusLiga.pl 
 Player profile at Volleybox.net

1994 births
Living people
Sportspeople from Poitiers
French men's volleyball players
Olympic volleyball players of France
Olympic medalists in volleyball
Olympic gold medalists for France
Volleyball players at the 2020 Summer Olympics
Medalists at the 2020 Summer Olympics
French expatriate sportspeople in Poland
Expatriate volleyball players in Poland
French expatriate sportspeople in Russia
Expatriate volleyball players in Russia
French expatriate sportspeople in Italy
Expatriate volleyball players in Italy
Paris Volley players
Projekt Warsaw players
VC Zenit Saint Petersburg players
Setters (volleyball)